Puente la Reina de Jaca (in Aragonese: Puen d'a Reina de Chaca) is a municipality located in Jacetania, province of Huesca, Aragon, Spain. According to the 2009 census (INE), the municipality has a population of 218 inhabitants.

Puente la Reina de Jaca is situated on the bank of the river Aragón next to a bridge which gave it its name.

This region was reconquered in 833 by Galindo Aznárez I who was related to the French Carolingian court.

Villages
Santa Engracia de Jaca 
Javierregay

References

Municipalities in the Province of Huesca